Dance with the Witches was the 8th album by the German heavy metal band Stormwitch, released in 2002, it was their first since the band split up after the unsuccessful Shogun in 1994.

An acoustic version of the song "The Devil's Bride" has been recorded at Talk Heavy Radio / Münster and can be heard on the band's website.

Track listing
 "Intro/Man of Miracles" - 4:55
 "Dance with the Witches" - 3:39
 "Jeanne d'Arc" - 4:14
 "The Knights of Lights" - 3:31
 "The Devil's Bride" - 2:59
 "Nothing More" - 5:35
 "The House of Usher" - 5:28
 "The King of Terrors" - 4:38
 "Proud and Honest" - 3:09
 "My World" - 5:26
 "The Altar of Love" - 6:19
 "Together" - 4:25

2002 albums